Aggression refers to negative behavior or attitudes toward another, mainly by applying physical force. Evolution on the other hand, is any process of formation or development of something like habit, trait or character in a population from generation to generation. Evolution can explain why fish exhibit aggression because it is a simple emotion. This emotion increases an individual's survival or reproduction. Aggressive behavior can derive in fish species due to territory, sex specific selection and genetic variation. There is no specific fish species who display invasive behavior. Almost all the fish are aggressive sometimes in their lives depending on their surroundings.

Territorial aggression
Fish territory, or in another word, defended areas are generally ruled by a single individual or by breeding pairs. The guarded resource may include food, shelter, sexual partner or offspring. While protecting their regions, fish often display aggressive behavior against their intruders. The territory owner strikes at competing fish directly ending in a bite, or a bump. Such aggressive behavior is seen in large juveniles, females and other fish of the same kind from the same area. To better understand this topic, consider the male three-spine stickleback, Gasterosteus aculeatus, as an example. Theo Bakker's paper claims the three-spine stickleback male fish is polygynous—meaning they prefer two or more female mates in a territory. Thus, males are highly aggressive so they have access to females in a particular territory, which also leads to intrasexual selection among males. Intrasexual selection is selection within the same sex. For instance, some male animals compete against one another, physically, for access to females for their kind. So, characters like big tail, sharp teeth or similar weaponry that can be used against other males of the same species as means of mating with females is a selective advantage.

There is a deep relationship between the aggression in fish and the size of the regions owned by them. In a smaller territory, female fish often disappear before mating. Female fish are not bound to mate with a particular fish. If by chance a female get attracted to another male, she can dump the previous partner without any hesitation. In this situation, the ditched male fish become more aggressive to find mates in order to reproduce. Their levels of aggression increase more when the rates of sneaking by rival males go up too. The sneaking males enter the nest and release their own sperm over the eggs of the breeding fish. The rival fish here are using alternative reproduction methods like parental, sneaker or satellite to avoid being hurt by breeding males. On the other hand, the breeding males have higher mating success and endure less looting of the eggs in large territories. Once the eggs have been gathered, the breeding males decrease their territories to protect their offspring from the predators during their parental phase. After the eggs have hatched, the males’ continue to show similar or more invasive behavior due to increased reproductive value of offspring and the awareness of newly hatched young fish against enemies.

Territorial aggression can take place not only due to the pressure of mating, producing offspring, or intruders, but also from light intensity. The term intensity is used to describe the rate at which light spreads over a surface of a given area some distance from a source. At lower light levels, the risk of losing resources like food and mates give rise to aggressive behavior among the fish belonging to a territory. Additionally, for further understanding on how the rate of aggression and distance among neighboring fish varied with nighttime light intensities in the same area, Sveinn Valdimarsson and Neil Metcalfe conducted an experiment with the juveniles of Atlantic salmon, Salmo salar. At the beginning, S. salar were disclosed to four different nighttime light intensities (0.00, 0.01, 0.50 and 1.00 lx) for 24 hours period. From the result, it was concluded that fish showed less aggression when the intensity of the light was lower. This is because when the level of light was intense, due to darkness of night the territorial fish failed to detect their food or other members in the same area. So they decreased their territory size and remained closer to each other than attacking. This was a good example of evolution of cooperation among the fish. Additionally, as the light intensities of the light increased, those fish could see each other to defend their space. The territory size increases during bright lights. In short, the aggressive behavior of the salmon toward their rivals is highly manipulated by light intensities. Thus, the size of the space that the fish is defending increases or decreases between day and night.

Sex-specific aggression 
Male and female fish both get involved in aggressive confrontation. Yet varying selection pressures affecting each sex result in gender differences in aggressive syndrome during competition. Aggressive syndrome is a social condition describing an individual's need to show his distaste or dislike against certain individuals. Adult female fish usually gather in groups, including adult females and non-reproductive males. Aggressive behavior is displayed in females especially when the female fish attack directly on each other. Dominance relationships can take place among female association. For instance, females of higher status (size) have better opportunities to mate than minors residing in the same group. Then females become aggressive when there are two dominant females trying to select the same male fish for mating. This selection can be based on intersexual selection, which is selection between two sexes. Females use such selection while choosing mates with good genes. For example, female peacocks tend to prefer male peacocks with bright plumage. The females think that if they mate with males with bright plumage, the offspring will have similar characteristic.

S. Josefin Dahlbom and colleagues, experimented on zebra fish, Danio rerio, to study the difference in aggression level between males and females if they are put together under similar environment. For this testing, fish were paired with one of the same sex. As the experiment continued, it was observed that both dominant males and females increase their aggression level until day four. On the fifth day, the dominant female members in the group stopped being aggressive. The authors suggested that this could be because the subordinate females stopped challenging the dominant female early in the study, and thereby the dominant female did not need to prove her superiority. In contrast, male subordinates continued fighting against the dominant males. As a result, the dominant males showed more aggression to suppress the subordinate males and to maintain their position among others.

In the paper ‘Gender differences in aggressive behavior in convict cichlids’ Gareth Arnott and Robert W. Elwood investigated if gender related variations in aggression are seen in convict cichlids, Amatitlania nigrofasciata. To see gender-related changes in aggression, they tested if intersexual agonistic events take place between isolated males and females, who were not previously paired to each other as breeding partners. At the end, it was detected that in terms of encroachment, Texas cichlids males used lateral display along with tail biting; whereas, the females used frontal display with biting. These two different displays have an explanation. Convict cichlids generally use either their left or right eye while swimming. Therefore, these fish use either their left or right hemisphere of the brain. Aggressive males are believed to use only their left hemisphere; whereas, aggressive females navigate based on their right eyes. Although a clear conclusion cannot be drawn from this study between the hemispheres and the aggression levels, it is fairly seen that males and females show variation in aggression syndrome. In short, various forces affecting each sex can result in distant aggressive behavior among male and female fish.

Aggression for genetic makeup 
Evolution of aggression can occur in fish due to their genetic makeup. To examine the relationship between aggression and genetic makeup, a team from CNRS/Laboratoire Neurobiologie et Développement conducted an experiment on zebra fish, spiegeldanio. At the beginning, the team of CNRS organized behavioral tests to quantitatively measure the three characters of aggressive behavior. In the experiment, it turned out that this particular fish has a mutation in its fgfr-1 gene summarizing for a membrane receptor sensitive to FGF (Fibroblast Growth Factor), which is a key for growth factor in those fish. As a reaction to the mutation, this group of fish displays low brain levels of histamine. Histamine is a neurotransmitter that controls appetite, sleep and attention in a species. Due to low histamine levels, zebra fish exhibit aggressive behavior. Therefore, the link between the fgfr-1 genes to histamine regulates the behavioral status of aggression in zebra fish. 
	In another experiment Katrina Tiira performed a different test on land-locked salmon, Salmo salar to see if juveniles with low estimated genetic diversity showed less aggression. To continue the theory, researches selected one group of fish with low genetic diversity and another group with high genetic diversity, and compared aggression levels. They observed that salmon fry with low genetic variation showed less aggression than the other group. In the group of less variation, the researcher used closely related parents. The juveniles were genetically related sharing high number of alleles with each other. Thus, they display low aggression to their competitors as they used kin recognition method on others. In conclusion, it can be explained that genetic variation in salmon can manipulate the agnostic syndrome if the individuals in a group are closely related.

Aggression in fish can be increased by the effect of growth hormone, or GH, which has an essential growth factor in this species. They control the use of nutrients in tissue synthesis. Thus, it increases the metabolic demands in species resulting in aggression to fight for daily needs. An experiment was designed on juvenile rainbow trout, Oncorhynchus mykiss. They selected two control fish (C/C pairs), two growth hormone treated fish (GH/GH pairs) or one growth hormone-treated and one control (C/GH pairs). From the testing, it was analyzed that the GH increases aggression levels in all groups of O. mykiss. It indirectly improved the swimming activity along with the attacking rate between competitors. In summary, growth hormone plays a vital role in controlling aggression in rainbow trout and other fish.

References 

Reebs, Stéphan G (2008). "Aggression in Fishes." University de Moncton, Canada. Valdimarsson, Sveinn K., and Neil B. Metcalfe (2001). "Is the level of aggression and dispersion in territorial fish dependent on light intensity?." Animal Behaviour 61.6: 1143–1149.
Sih, Andrew, Alison Bell, and J. Chadwick Johnson (2004). "Behavioral syndromes: an ecological and evolutionary overview." Trends in Ecology & Evolution 19.7: 372–378.

Aggression
Aggression